Daydreams (Грёзы) is a 1915 Russian silent film directed by Yevgeni Bauer.

Plot 

Sergei is devastated by the death of his beloved wife Yelena. He becomes more and more obsessed by her and more and more often sees visions of her ghost. He starts an affair with an actress who looks like his dead wife but progressively drifts into madness with dramatic consequences.

Production 
Daydreams was produced by A. Khanzhonkov and Co. the company created by Aleksandr Khanzhonkov, Russia's first cinema entrepreneur.

Film crew 
Director: Evgeny Bauer

Scriptwriters: M. Basov and Valentin Turkin

Cameraman: Boris Zavelev

Producer: Alexander Khanzhonkov

Cast
 Alexandr Vyrubov as Sergei Nikolaevich Nedelin
 F. Werchowzewa as Yelena, his wife 
 Viktor Arens as Solski, a painter 
 N. Chernobajewa as Tina Wlarskaja, an actress

References

External links
 
 Gryozy (1915) at A Cinema History

Russian black-and-white films
Russian silent films
Articles containing video clips
Films of the Russian Empire
1910s Russian-language films